The 2019 Mexican Open was a professional tennis tournament played on outdoor hard courts. It was the 26th edition of the men's Mexican Open (19th for the women), and was part of the 2019 ATP Tour and the 2019 WTA Tour. It took place in Acapulco, Mexico between 25 February and 2 March 2019, at the Princess Mundo Imperial.

Points and prize money

Point distribution

Prize money 

1 Qualifiers prize money is also the Round of 32 prize money
* per team

ATP singles main-draw entrants

Seeds

1 Rankings as of February 18, 2019.

Other entrants 
The following players received wildcards into the main draw:
  David Ferrer
  Gerardo López Villaseñor
  Emilio Nava

The following player received entry via a special exempt:
  Mackenzie McDonald

The following players received entry from the qualifying draw:
  Federico Gaio 
  Marcel Granollers
  Ryan Harrison
  Alexei Popyrin

The following player received entry as a lucky loser:
  Guillermo García López

Withdrawals
  Kevin Anderson → replaced by  Mischa Zverev
  Grigor Dimitrov → replaced by  Cameron Norrie
  Taylor Fritz → replaced by  Guillermo García López
  Martin Kližan → replaced by  Yoshihito Nishioka

ATP doubles main-draw entrants

Seeds 

1 Rankings as of February 18, 2019.

Other entrants 
The following pairs received wildcards into the doubles main draw:
  Santiago González /  Aisam-ul-Haq Qureshi  
  Nicholas Monroe  /  Miguel Ángel Reyes-Varela

The following pair received entry from the qualifying draw:
  Peter Gojowczyk /  Kevin Krawietz

WTA singles main-draw entrants

Seeds

1 Rankings as of February 18, 2019.

Other entrants
The following players received wildcards into the main draw:
  Victoria Azarenka 
  Renata Zarazúa
  Jil Teichmann

The following players received entry from the qualifying draw:
  Irina Bara
  Ysaline Bonaventure
  Varvara Flink
  Beatriz Haddad Maia
  Christina McHale
  Conny Perrin

The following player received entry as a lucky loser:
  Martina Trevisan

Withdrawals
  Ekaterina Alexandrova → replaced by  Laura Siegemund
  Eugenie Bouchard → replaced by  Amanda Anisimova
  Hsieh Su-wei → replaced by  Marie Bouzková
  Ajla Tomljanović → replaced by  Bianca Andreescu
  Stefanie Vögele → replaced by  Martina Trevisan

WTA doubles main-draw entrants

Seeds

1 Rankings as of February 18, 2019.

Other entrants 
The following pair received a wildcard into the doubles main draw:
  Marie Bouzková /  Renata Zarazúa
  Victoria Rodríguez  /  Ana Sofía Sánchez

Champions

Men's singles

  Nick Kyrgios def.  Alexander Zverev, 6–3, 6–4

Women's singles

  Wang Yafan def.  Sofia Kenin, 2–6, 6–3, 7–5

Men's doubles

  Alexander Zverev /  Mischa Zverev def.  Austin Krajicek /  Artem Sitak, 2–6, 7–6(7–4), [10–5]

Women's doubles

  Victoria Azarenka /  Zheng Saisai def.  Desirae Krawczyk /  Giuliana Olmos, 6–1, 6–2

References

External links
 

 
Abierto Mexicano Telcel
Abierto Mexicano Telcel
Abierto Mexicano Telcel
Abierto Mexicano Telcel
Mexican Open (tennis)